Cáca Milis is a 2001 Irish short film starring Charlotte Bradley and Brendan Gleeson.

Plot
An exhausted businesswoman named Catherine is sitting on a train reading a romantic novel. It is established that this is the only time in the day where she has time for herself, as she is otherwise caring for her ageing mother. A blind man with asthma called Pól sits across from her. He proceeds to annoy her and prevent her from reading her book in peace by making loud noises, asking peculiar questions and telling inane stories. When Catherine gets sick of Pól constantly annoying her, she begins to taunt and confuse him. She learns that he becomes short of breath when he is confused. Eventually, she tells him that a piece of the sweet cake that he is eating has a worm in it. When she tells him this he panics and begins to suffer from an asthma attack. He attempts to find his inhaler on the table, but Catherine quietly takes it and hides it from Pól. As he suffocates, she places the inhaler back down on the table just out of his reach. Pól slumps over in his seat as Catherine disembarks from the train.

Cast 
 Charlotte Bradley as Catherine, a businesswoman who's caring for her ageing mother 
 Brendan Gleeson as Pól, a blind man who uses the train regularly 
 Eithne McGuinness as Nora, Catherine's mother
 Phyllis Ryan as Theresa
 Ciabhán Ó Murchú as Tea Steward

Legacy
The film is studied by Irish students who study Irish for the Leaving Certificate Examination.  As such, it has become a cult classic among Irish youth.

References

External links

IrishFilmBoard.ie - Film Directory / Oscailt / Cáca Milis

2001 films
Irish-language films
Irish short films